Thomas Gordon Bezucha (born March 8, 1964) is an American filmmaker.

Career
Bezucha was born and raised in Amherst, Massachusetts, and graduated from Amherst Regional High School in 1982. He is a graduate in fashion design from the Parsons School of Design, and worked as a creative services executive for Polo Ralph Lauren and Coach.

He wrote and directed the films Big Eden (2000), The Family Stone (2005), Monte Carlo (2011), and Let Him Go (2020).  He also co-wrote the films The Guernsey Literary and Potato Peel Pie Society (2018) and The Good House (2021).

Bezucha is openly gay.

Filmography

References

External links

1964 births
Living people
21st-century American male writers
21st-century American screenwriters
American film directors
American gay writers
American male screenwriters
American film producers
English-language film directors
Film directors from Massachusetts
Film producers from Massachusetts
LGBT film directors
American LGBT screenwriters
Parsons School of Design alumni
Screenwriters from Massachusetts
Writers from Amherst, Massachusetts
Amherst Regional High School (Massachusetts) alumni